Ayanda Borotho (née Ngubane) born 13 January 1981) is a South African actress and former model best known for playing the title role in the SABC 1 sitcom Nomzamo, from 2007–2010, of which she replaced  Zinzile Zungu as well as Phumelele Zungu on Mzansi Magic’s telenovela 
Isibaya .

Early life
Ayanda Borotho was born on 13 January 1981 in the township of Ntuzuma near the city of Durban in the KwaZulu-Natal province of South Africa. She attended Brettonwood High School in Umbilo, Durban where was trained in speech and drama. She did an Integrated Marketing Communications diploma at the AAA School of Advertising from 1999–2001, specialising in strategic brand management.

Career
She began her acting career in 1999 after landing the role of babysitting schoolgirl Thami in the SABC 1 soapie Generations (South African TV series). In 2000 she had a minor role in the Leon Schuster film Mr Bones. In 2007 She replaced Zinzile Zungu as Nomzamo in the SABC 1 sitcom Nomzamo from season two. Ayanda played the minor role of Busi in the fourth season of the SABC 1 drama series Home Affairs, in 2009. In 2013 Ayanda was cast as Phumelele on Mzansi Magic's telenovela IsiBaya. In 2018 she was cast as Khethiwe in a South African television drama series Ambition in 2022 the actress landed a notable role on SABC 1 's Generation's   The Legacy as Dr Busisiwe .

Personal life
Ayanda Ngubane is married to a doctor and they have three children.
She stated that in her household she has a strict "No English Policy". Her children speak Zulu and Sotho at home.

Accolades
 She was nominated at MIPAD Awards.

References

1981 births
Living people
South African television actresses
21st-century South African actresses